Zia ol Din-e Olya (also Romanized as Ẕīā’ ol Dīn-e ‘Olyā; also known as Ẕīā’ od Dīn-e Bālā, Ẕīā’ ed Dīn-e Bālā, and Ẕīā od Dīn-e Bālā) is a village in Bala Velayat Rural District, in the Central District of Torbat-e Heydarieh County, Razavi Khorasan Province, Iran. At the 2006 census, its population was 434, in 107 families.

References 

Populated places in Torbat-e Heydarieh County